Naupala is a census town in Bagnan II CD Block of Uluberia subdivision in Howrah district in the Indian state of West Bengal.

Geography
It lies on the right bank of the Rupnarayan River.

Demographics
As per 2011 Census of India Naupala had a total population of 7,856 of which 4,035 (51%) were males and 3,821 (49%) were females. Population below 6 years was 959. The total number of literates in Naupala was 5,273 (76.45% of the population over 6 years).

 India census, Naupala had a population of 7,123. Males constitute 53% of the population and females 47%. Naupala has an average literacy rate of 61%, higher than the national average of 59.5%: male literacy is 67%, and female literacy is 54%. In Naupala, 13% of the population is under 6 years of age.

Transport
It is on NH 6.

References

Cities and towns in Howrah district